General Sir Henry Macleod Leslie Rundle,  (6 January 1856 – 19 November 1934) was a British Army general during the Second Boer War and the First World War.

Military career
Born in Newton Abbot, Devon, to Captain Joseph Sparkhall Rundle, a Royal Navy officer, and his wife Renira Cathrine (née Leslie, who was the daughter of Commander W. W. Leslie of the Royal Navy), Leslie Rundle was commissioned into the Royal Artillery in 1876. He fought in the Zulu War in 1879, the First Boer War of 1881 and the Anglo-Egyptian War of 1882. He was involved in the Nile expedition between 1884 and 1885 and served in the Sudan Frontier Field Force from 1885 to 1887. For service in the Khartoum expedition of 1898 he was promoted to Major-General for distinguished conduct in the field. He led a column up the Blue Nile to relieve Gedaref the same year.

Rundle became General Officer Commanding South-Eastern District on 29 December 1898. He was appointed Honorary Colonel of the 3rd (East Kent Militia) Battalion, Buffs (East Kent Regiment) on 21 June 1899.

After the escalation of the Second Boer War in late 1899, Rundle was in January 1900 appointed to the command of the 8th Division of the South African Field Force, with the temporary and local rank of lieutenant general. The appointment was described as "the most remarkable instance of advancement to high military office which has occurred in the recent history of [the] Army" by a contemporary issue of The Times. He left Southampton in the SS Moor in March 1900 with the staff of the 8th division and 600 men of militia regiments, and arrived in Cape Town the following month. He served as commander until early March 1902, when he returned to the United Kingdom on board the SS Carisbrook Castle. For his service in the war, he was mentioned in despatches (including by Lord Kitchener on 23 June 1902) and appointed a Knight Commander of the Order of St Michael and St George (KCMG) (the award was dated 29 November 1900 in the gazette, but he was only invested by King Edward VII after his return, at St James's Palace on 2 June 1902).

Following his return, he was in May 1902 back as General Officer Commanding South-Eastern District, based in Dover, and was on 14 May 1902 appointed in command of the 5th Division, stationed there.

He became General Officer Commanding North Eastern District in November 1903, General Officer Commanding-in-Chief of Northern Command in 1905 and Governor and Commander-in-Chief of Malta in 1909. He went on to be General Officer Commanding-in-Chief of Eastern Command in 1915 and retired in 1916.

Rundle was presented with the Freedom of the borough of Dover on 29 October 1902, while living there as General Officer Commanding South-Eastern district.

Family
Rundle married in 1887 Eleanor Georgina Campbell, daughter of Captain H. J. M. Campbell, Royal Artillery, but they had no children.

References

|-

|-
 

|-

|-

|-
 

1856 births
1934 deaths
British Army generals
Military personnel from Devon
British Army generals of World War I
Knights Grand Cross of the Order of the Bath
Knights Grand Cross of the Order of St Michael and St George
Knights Grand Cross of the Royal Victorian Order
Companions of the Distinguished Service Order
Royal Artillery officers
British Army personnel of the Anglo-Zulu War
British military personnel of the First Boer War
British Army personnel of the Mahdist War
British Army personnel of the Second Boer War
People from Newton Abbot
Governors and Governors-General of Malta